Jaime Mendes (20 August 1913 – 2 October 1990) was a Portuguese long-distance runner. He competed in the marathon at the 1936 Summer Olympics.

References

External links
 

1913 births
1990 deaths
Athletes (track and field) at the 1936 Summer Olympics
Portuguese male long-distance runners
Portuguese male marathon runners
Olympic athletes of Portugal
Place of birth missing